Inđija railway station is located 1 km from the city center of Inđija. Regularly railway station for fast passenger trains. Railroad continued to Inđija Pustara in one, and Stara Pazova in the other direction, in the third direction towards to Golubinci. Inđija railway station consists of 7 railway track.

See also 
 Serbian Railways
 Beovoz

Inđija
Railway stations in Vojvodina